Kebun Gerand is an Administrative Area in the Bengkulu Province, Indonesia. This village has a population of 2239 according to the 2010 census.

References

 Census Results (2010), Badan Pusat Statistics, Population_of_Indonesia_by_Village
Kebun Gerand